The 1923–24 season is the 50th season of competitive football by Rangers.

Overview
Rangers played a total of 41 competitive matches during the 1923–24 season. The team finished top of the league, nine points ahead of second placed Airdrieonians, after winning twenty-five of the 38 league games.

The side was knocked out of the Scottish Cup in the third round that season. After overcoming Lochgelly United and St Mirren, a 2–1 defeat to Hibernian ended the campaign.

Results
All results are written with Rangers' score first.

Scottish League Division One

Scottish Cup

Appearances

See also
1923–24 in Scottish football
1923–24 Scottish Cup

Rangers F.C. seasons
Rangers
Scottish football championship-winning seasons